Dihydrosanguinarine is an alkaloid found in the herbs Corydalis adunca and Lamprocapnos spectabilis.

See also 
 Dihydrosanguinarine 10-monooxygenase
 Sanguinarine
 Epidemic dropsy

References

Benzodioxoles
Isoquinoline alkaloids
Quinoline alkaloids